Anbil P. Dharmalingam was a politician from the Indian state of Tamil Nadu and founder member of Dravida Munnetra Kazhagam. The Anbil Dharmalingam Agricultural College and Research Institute is named after him.

Politics 
Anbil Dharmalingam was one of the founder-members of the Dravida Munnetra Kazhagam (DMK).

When the DMK was elected to power in 1967, Dharmalingam served as the Minister for Local Administration and Agriculture a various times.

At a rally held in North Arcot district on 7 and 8 April 1973 in which Dharmalingam and five other Ministers presided, he declared that formation of an independent Tamil Nadu was the aim of the DMK.

Electoral records 
He was elected to the Tamil Nadu legislative assembly as a Dravida Munnetra Kazhagam candidate from Lalgudi constituency in 1962 and 1980 elections and from Tiruchirappalli - II constituency in 1971 election.

Family & Death 
Anbil Dharmalingam died in 1993,His sons Anbil Periyasamy and Anbil Poyyamozhi have been members of Dravida Munnetra Kazhagam and have served in Tamil Nadu legislative assembly.

References 

Dravidian movement
Dravida Munnetra Kazhagam politicians
1919 births
1993 deaths